Domestication is the process whereby a population of animals is changed at the genetic level, accentuating traits desired by humans.

Domestication may also refer to:

 Domestication theory, an approach in science, technology studies and media studies that describes the processes by which innovations are 'tamed' or appropriated by their users
 Domestication and foreignization, strategies in translation regarding the degree to which translators make a text conform to the target culture